Lemon and Poppy Seed Cake is a 2021 Spanish-Luxembourgish film directed by Benito Zambrano, based on the novel of the same name.

Plot 
The plot follows Anna and Marina, two sisters who set up a bakery in Majorca together.

Cast

Production 

Lemon and Poppy Seed Cake is based on the novel of the same name by Cristina Campos. The film was produced by Filmax alongside Deal Productions and La Periférica Produccions, with the participation of RTVE, Movistar+ and TVC and support from the ICAA and the Luxembourg Film Fund.

It was primarily shot in Valldemosa (island of Mallorca), but footage was also shot in locations of the island of Gran Canaria, including Guía, Firgas, Arucas and Fataga.

Release 
The film had its world premiere at the 66th Valladolid Film Festival (Seminci) on 24 October 2021 (2nd day). It also screened at the Seville European Film Festival (SEFF) and the Evolution Mallorca International Film Festival (EMIFF) . Distributed by Filmax, the film was theatrically released in Spain on 12 November 2021.

Awards and nominations 

|-
| align = "center" rowspan = "4" | 2022 || rowspan = "2" | 1st Carmen Awards || Best  Director || Benito Zambrano ||  || rowspan = "2" | 
|-
| Best Screenplay || Benito Zambrano || 
|-
| 77th CEC Medals || Best Adapted Screenplay || Benito Zambrano ||  || 
|-
| 36th Goya Awards || Best Adapted Screenplay || Benito Zambrano, Cristina Campos ||  || 
|}

See also 
 List of Spanish films of 2021

References

External links 
 Lemon and Poppy Seed Cake at ICAA's Catálogo de Cinespañol

Films based on Spanish novels
2021 films
2020s Spanish-language films
Spanish drama films
Luxembourgian drama films
Films set in the Balearic Islands
Films shot in the Balearic Islands
Films shot in the Canary Islands
2020s Spanish films